The Yucatan deer mouse (Peromyscus yucatanicus) is a species of rodent in the family Cricetidae. The species is found in Mexico and Guatemala; an example habitat is the Petenes mangroves ecoregion of the Yucatan.

References

 G.G.Musser and M. D. Carleton. (2005). Superfamily Muroidea. pp. 894–1531 in Mammal Species of the World a Taxonomic and Geographic Reference. D. E. Wilson and D. M. Reeder eds. Johns Hopkins University Press, Baltimore.
 World Wildlife Fund. (2010). Petenes mangroves. eds. Mark McGinley, C.Michael Hogan & C.Cleveland. Encyclopedia of Earth. National Council for Science and the Environment. Washington DC

Yucatan deer mouse
Yucatan deer mouse
Yucatan deer mouse
Yucatan deer mouse
Fauna of the Yucatán Peninsula
Mammals described in 1897
Taxonomy articles created by Polbot